Njembot Mbodj (or Njembot Mbooj or Njëmbët Mbooj, variations: Ndjeumbeut Mbodj or Djembet Mbodj, c. 1800 – 1846 or 1811—1846) was a Lingeer (Queen) of Waalo, a Senegambian precolonial kingdom which is now part of present-day Senegal.

Njembot Mbodj became ruler at an early age, after the deaths of her parents. She soon proved herself an able leader despite her youth; in this, she was aided by her personality, which has been described as being both assertive and brave. In 1831 she got her uncle, Fara Penda Adam Sall Mbodj, elected as brak to replace her cousin Yerim Bagnik Teg Rela Mbodj. After the withdrawal of the French, the Trarza invaded Waalo in an attempt to destabilize the kingdom. Njembot Mbodj arranged for herself a marriage with the leader of the Trarza, Mohammed el-Habib (with whom she had a son called Ely Ndjeumbeut el-Habib), which united the two kingdoms and made it easier for them to oppose French interests. Forced to flee to Kayor by the invading French, she was later able to return home and to contain the power struggle in Waalo. In 1840, at the death of the brak, she managed to engineer the election of Malick Mbodj as replacement. Njembot Mbodj herself died in 1846, and was succeeded by her sister Ndate Yalla Mbodj.

References

1800s births
Year of birth uncertain
1846 deaths
19th-century rulers in Africa
Lingeer
Senegalese royalty
Serer royalty
Wolof people
Fula people
Gambian royalty
Mauritanian royalty